Jan Pusty (born June 3, 1952 in Koło) is a retired male hurdler from Poland. His personal best was 13.53 seconds on the 110m hurdles.

He won a silver medal at the 1978 European Championships in Athletics, and finished fifth at the 1980 Olympics.

International competitions

1Representing Europe

References
Profile at Sporting Heroes

1952 births
Living people
Polish male hurdlers
Athletes (track and field) at the 1980 Summer Olympics
Olympic athletes of Poland
People from Koło County
European Athletics Championships medalists
Sportspeople from Greater Poland Voivodeship
Universiade medalists in athletics (track and field)
Universiade silver medalists for Poland
Medalists at the 1977 Summer Universiade
20th-century Polish people